The 2000 Omloop Het Volk was the 54th edition of the Omloop Het Volk cycle race and was held on 26 February 2000. The race started in Ghent and finished in Lokeren. The race was won by Johan Museeuw.

General classification

References

2000
Omloop Het Nieuwsblad
Omloop Het Nieuwsblad
February 2000 sports events in Europe